Chiquimula Airport  is an airport serving Chiquimula, the capital of Chiquimula Department, Guatemala.

There is nearby mountainous terrain north through southeast of the airport, and distant mountainous terrain in other quadrants.

See also
 Transport in Guatemala
 List of airports in Guatemala

References

 Google Earth

External links
 OpenStreetMap - Chiquimula
 OurAirports - Chiquimula Airport
 FallingRain - Chiquimula Airport
 

Airports in Guatemala
Petén Department